Michael Allmand VC (22 August 1923 – 24 June 1944) was an English Second World War recipient of the Victoria Cross, the highest and most prestigious award for gallantry in the face of the enemy that can be awarded to British and Commonwealth forces.

Born into a Catholic family in London in 1923, Allmand attended Ampleforth College before studying history at Oxford University in 1941. He joined the British Indian Army in 1942 and was commissioned into the Indian Armoured Corps for service in the Far East.

He later volunteered to serve with the Chindits and in 1944 saw action against the Japanese during the Battle of Mogaung, during which he was killed in action at the age of 20.

Early life
Michael Allmand was born in Golders Green, London, to Professor Arthur John MC and Marguerite Marie Allmand on 22 August 1923. Allmand's father, son of Frank (1858-1948) and Mary Allmand, née Thomas (1861-1918), was a Professor of chemistry at Kings College London and later dean of the faculty who came from a flour milling family in Wrexham, England (later Wales). The Allmands had it's origins in the Malpas area of Cheshire. Allmands mother Marguerite hailed from a family of Normans from the Saint-Lô district who were small landowners and professionals. Allmand grew up in a bilingual home speaking both English and French.

Allmand had a brother, the medieval historian Christopher Allmand (1936 – 2022), and a sister Marguerite Allmand (1921 - 2009) later Marguerite Murphy who was a member of the Auxiliary Territorial Service and worked as a code breaker at Bletchley Park during the Second World War.Allmand was raised in a Roman Catholic family, with his father being a convert to the faith and later a Knight of the Order of St. Gregory the Great, who were parishioners at St. Edward the Confessor Church Golders Green. Allmand himself had a deep and abiding religious faith.

Allmands childhood home was at No 5 North Square, Hampstead Garden Suburb.

Allmand was educated at the Benedictine Public School Ampleforth College, in North Yorkshire, England, before attending Oriel College, Oxford University in 1941 where he began to study history. While at Oxford, Allmand served as the founding editor of a literary review journal called The Wind and the Rain, and began writing a biography of Edmund Burke.

His

Military career
At the end of 1942, amidst the backdrop of the Second World War, Allmand left university and joined the British Indian Army. He was commissioned into the Indian Armoured Corps, and assigned to the 6th Duke of Connaught's Own Lancers. Allmand was sent to India where, following a call from GHQ India, he volunteered for service with the Chindits during the Operation Thursday and was subsequently attached to the 3rd Battalion, 6th Gurkha Rifles (3/6 GR).

For the operation, 3/6 GR were assigned to the 77th Brigade, under the command of Brigadier Mike Calvert, and divided into two columns. They were flown in by glider to a landing zone code named "Broadway" in the northern Kaukwe valley on 5 March 1944. Despite heavy casualties and the destruction of a large number of gliders, a stronghold was established and from there columns were sent out to the north and south. The 3/6 GR were sent north towards Mawlu and Hopin where they probed Japanese defences. They were later sent north to another stronghold dubbed "Blackpool" where they were tasked with supporting Chinese forces around Mogaung and Myitkyina under US General Joseph Stilwell, who re-roled them as conventional infantry. Beginning on 6 June, the 77th Brigade advanced the final  to Mogaung with the intent of capturing it. Amid monsoonal rains and suffering heavy casualties from the fighting as well as tropical diseases, the advance took a heavy toll on the Chindits; they were facing over 4,000 Japanese and by the end of the first week the brigade, having started with over 2,000 men,  was down to just 550 and each battalion was at company strength.

Initially, Allmand was given command of a platoon; however, later he was promoted to acting captain and took over command of a company. During the assault, his platoon took heavy fire and the attack stalled; leading from the front, Allmand went ahead, rallying his troops as he attacked the defenders with grenades and his kukri. He was again in the thick of the fighting on 13 June when, having taken over a company following the loss of its commander, he led an assault to secure some high ground by singlehandedly destroying several machine-gun positions.

On 23 June, during the final stages of the advance on Mogaung, Allmand's company was tasked with capturing Natyigon village and securing the railway bridge that spanned the Mogaung River. Attacking to the left of the "Red House", Allmand's company was held up by machine-gun fire from an embankment near the bridge, Allmand went forward again. His movement hampered by severe trench foot, which had set in due to the poor conditions that the chindits had faced since starting the campaign in March, he nevertheless fought his way "through deep mud and shell-holes" and knocked out the machine-gun with grenades before being wounded. A short time later, another member of 3/6 GR, Tul Bahadur Pun, charged the bridge singlehandedly, killing the remaining Japanese defenders and securing it for the Gurkhas. Both Tul Bahadur and Allmand were later nominated for the Victoria Cross.

It was largely due to  Allmand's bravery that Mogaung was captured. Although he was pulled out of the line of fire by another Gurkha – Sergeant Tilbir Gurung, who received the Military Medal for his act – Allmand subsequently died of his wounds early on 24 June. At the time he was just two months short of his twenty-first birthday. His Victoria Cross was awarded posthumously and was presented to his family by King George VI at Buckingham Palace on 17 July 1945, having been announced in the London Gazette on 26 October 1944. Allmand also received the following other decorations: the 1939–1945 Star, the Burma Star and the War Medal 1939–1945.

Allmand's body is interred at the Taukkyan War Cemetery, in Burma.

Victoria Cross citation
The citation in the London Gazette which announced Allmand's award reads:

Legacy 

The Victoria Cross medal remained in Allmand's family's possession until 1991, when it was presented to the Regimental Trust in Hong Kong. Later, in 2003, the medal was donated to the Gurkha Museum at Winchester in Hampshire, England.

Allmand's life is commemorated in the Memorial Window at the St Edward the Confessor Catholic Church in Golders Green, London. 

Allmand is named on the Chindit Memorial, Memorial Gates and the Oriel College War memorial. He is also commemorated in John Bunting's Scotch Corners Chapel, a chapel on the edge of the North Yorkshire Moores dedicated to the War dead of Ampleforth College.

The Michael Allmand Trophy is presented by the Combined Cadet Force contingent at Ampleforth College to the Cadet who scores the highest in their leadership competition. Allmand is also commemorated in the Library of Ampleforth where a painted portrait of him hangs.

See also
 List of Brigade of Gurkhas recipients of the Victoria Cross
 John Lucas (MC)
 Old Amplefordians
 Alumni of Oriel College

References

Notes

Further reading

External links
Burial location of Michael Allmand
Location of Michael Allmand's Victoria Cross

1923 births
1944 deaths
English Roman Catholics
Indian World War II recipients of the Victoria Cross
People from Golders Green
British World War II recipients of the Victoria Cross
British Indian Army officers
Indian Army personnel killed in World War II
People educated at Ampleforth College
Alumni of the University of Oxford
Burials at Taukkyan War Cemetery
Military personnel from London
British people in colonial India